Araeococcus is a genus of the botanical family Bromeliaceae, subfamily Bromelioideae. It is native to northern South America, Central America and Trinidad.

The genus name is from the Greek araios (thin, weak, slight) and the Latin coccus (berry). It was divided into two subgenera, the type subgenus and subgenus Pseudaraeococcus, before the latter was raised to the separate genus Pseudaraeococcus in 2020.

Species 
Accepted species:
 Araeococcus flagellifolius Harms - Colombia, Venezuela, the Guianas, northern Brazil
 Araeococcus goeldianus L.B.Sm. - Amapá, French Guiana
 Araeococcus micranthus Brongn. - Trinidad & Tobago, Venezuela, the Guianas, northern Brazil
 Araeococcus pectinatus L.B.Sm. - Costa Rica, Panama, Colombia

Transferred to Pseudaraeococcus:
 Araeococcus chlorocarpus (Wawra) Leme & J.A. Siqueira → Pseudaraeococcus chlorocarpus - Bahia
 Araeococcus montanus Leme → Pseudaraeococcus montanus - Bahia
 Araeococcus nigropurpureus Leme & J.A. Siqueira → Pseudaraeococcus nigropurpureus - Bahia
 Araeococcus parviflorus (Martius & Schultes f.) Lindman → Pseudaraeococcus parviflorus - Bahia 
 Araeococcus sessiliflorus Leme & J.A. Siqueira → Pseudaraeococcus sessiliflorus - Bahia

References

External links 
 BSI Genera Gallery photos

 
Bromeliaceae genera
Taxa named by Adolphe-Théodore Brongniart